Chrysovalantis Kapartis (born 26 October 1991) is a Cypriot footballer who plays for Olympiakos Nicosia as a winger.

References

1991 births
Living people
Cypriot footballers
Olympiakos Nicosia players
Chalkanoras Idaliou players
ENTHOI Lakatamia FC players
PAEEK players
Ethnikos Achna FC players
ASIL Lysi players
Cypriot First Division players
Cypriot Second Division players
Association football wingers